Ambro is a surname. Notable people with the surname include:

Jerome Ambro (1928–1993), American politician
Jerome G. Ambro (1897–1979), American lawyer and politician
Thomas L. Ambro (born 1949), American judge

See also
Ambros